Bala Bachchan is a member of INC and member of the Madhya Pradesh Legislative Assembly. He was the Home Minister of Madhya Pradesh in the Kamal Nath ministry.

Positions held 

Home Minister, Jail Minister, Skill Development, Technical Education, Attached to CM (2018-2020)
Legislator (Five times) - Rajpur & Pansemal
Minister of Health, M.P. Govt. (1998-2003)
Secretary of AICC (2012-2018)
Deputy leader of opposition, Madhya Pradesh Assembly (2013-2018)
Leader of opposition (acting) M.P. legislative assembly (2015-2017)
M.P. Congress President (working)  (2018-Incumbent)
Chetan Agrawal (MLA Representative)

Bachchan, former minister in the Digvijay Singh-led Congress government has been conferred with the Home and Jail Ministry.

Madhya Pradesh Legislative Assembly

References 

Madhya Pradesh MLAs 2013–2018
Indian National Congress politicians from Madhya Pradesh
Leaders of the Opposition in Madhya Pradesh
1966 births
Living people
Madhya Pradesh MLAs 1993–1998
Madhya Pradesh MLAs 1998–2003
Madhya Pradesh MLAs 2008–2013